Forager is an open-world adventure game developed by Argentine studio HopFrog and published by Humble Bundle. The game was officially released for Microsoft Windows in April 2019, and later became available for Nintendo Switch, PlayStation 4, Xbox One, iOS, and Android.

In Forager, the player progresses by obtaining resources that spawn throughout the world, crafting new buildings, objects, and tools, solving puzzles, and collecting money to buy new lands to explore and utilize.

Gameplay
Forager combines mechanics commonly seen in idle games with those of an adventure or exploration game. With resources that respawn at a very high rate, the player will find themselves able to harvest massive amounts for crafting and leveling, eventually leading to automated systems to collect resources and produce other products and goods.

The leveling system in the game consists of a large grid of unlockable perks, which also may unlock new tools or craftable objects. Everything the player does from harvesting resources, to crafting objects, to killing enemies, has a positive impact on their XP used to advance levels.

The player is able to simulate a variety of tasks related to cooking, economics, engineering, farming, fishing, hunting, magic, manufacturing, mining, and more.

By obtaining money through crafting, skills, looting, and economic tasks, the player is able to purchase more lands to expand their base, explore new areas, and obtain new classes of resources or encounter new enemies and other NPC.

Development 
The creator of Forager, Mariano Cavallero, dropped out of school to develop video games. For a year he learned how to program, but unfortunately nobody was interested in his games at first. After he ran out of money, he moved back home to his mom, who invested her life savings into her son's projects. He started developing Forager in a Game Jam but eventually ran out of money again. Before giving up, Mariano participated in one last competition, in which he won a trip to the US to show off his work. A friend he met at a conference was late to a meeting because he was playing Forager. The person he was meeting had to come look for him, and he showed Forager to this person. This person was working for Humble Bundle and offered a publishing deal for Forager. A year after release on Steam the game had sold 600,000 units.

Reception

Forager received "generally favorable" reviews, according to review aggregator Metacritic.

Nathan Grayson wrote a review on Kotaku calling Forager an "extremely well-made" game and called it "obviously a labor of love" while also noting that the game was "a crafting game stripped down to its very bones" and stating that players may prefer a game with "more than pure progression". Jeff Ramos on Polygon says that the game's repetitive and tedious nature serve to "make the game's bright moments all the brighter" and says that "in Forager, grinding is almost all I have to do, and I can hardly pull myself away" praising the game for its use of grind-heavy mechanics. Jordan Devore of Destructoid called Forager a "[game] that knows the value of a good grind" and praised its open-ended design structure. Ollie Reynolds of Nintendo Life lauded the engaging gameplay, crafting mechanics, and charming presentation while taking minor issue with a few quality of life design choices. In a much more critical review. Jordan Rudek of Nintendo World Report commended the game's colorful presentation, laid-back gameplay, procedural generation elements, and free content updates while lamenting its aimless nature, repetitive gameplay, and environmental navigation. Stephen Tailby of Push Square similarly praised the addicting nature of the gameplay aided by the pixel art style and relaxing soundtrack, and criticized the fiddly controls as well as the combat. Brittany Vincent of Shacknews enjoyed the rewarding and accessible nature of the gameplay and disliked the unintelligent AI and shallow dungeon design.

Pocket Gamer and TouchArcade criticized the game's touch controls on iOS and Android while ultimately maintaining that the charming and engaging nature of the game was successfully retained.

References

External links
 

2019 video games
Indie video games
Nintendo Switch games
PlayStation 4 games
Single-player video games
Video games developed in Argentina
Video games using procedural generation
Game jam video games
Windows games
Xbox Cloud Gaming games
Xbox One games
Humble Games games